Gillian Porter (born 13 April 1965 in Coleraine) is a Northern Irish television presenter. She is best known for her work at UTV, where she was a long-serving continuity announcer and newsreader for 27 years.

Broadcasting career
Before joining UTV, Porter briefly worked as a continuity announcer and playout director at BBC Northern Ireland. In 1998, she presented the first series of UTV Life (originally broadcast weekly on Sundays before becoming a weeknight show).

In later years, Porter was one of two out-of-vision announcers at UTV, alongside Julian Simmons, voicing pre-recorded links.

In April 2020, local continuity was abandoned, initially as a temporary measure, due to the impact of the COVID-19 pandemic on staff at the Belfast studios. In November 2020, Porter announced she had left UTV, following a decision to switch permanently to ITV network presentation.

Porter voiced the final local UTV continuity link, broadcast at 5:59am on Thursday 2 April 2020.

She is now a freelance broadcaster and voiceover artist.

Personal life
Porter is married to Dee Colbert and has two children Zara and Sam.

References

1965 births
Living people
Television presenters from Northern Ireland
People from Coleraine, County Londonderry
Radio and television announcers
UTV (TV channel)